Elk Creek Township is a township in Jasper County, Iowa, USA.

History
Elk Creek Township was established in 1846.

References

Townships in Jasper County, Iowa
Townships in Iowa
1846 establishments in Iowa Territory